Teotitlán District is located in the north of the Cañada Region of the State of Oaxaca, Mexico.

Municipalities

The district includes the following municipalities:
 
Ejutla de Crespo
Eloxochitlán de Flores Magón
Huautepec
Municipality of Huautla de Jiménez
Mazatlán Villa de Flores
San Antonio Nanahuatipam
San Bartolomé Ayautla
San Francisco Huehuetlán
San Jerónimo Tecoatl
San José Tenango
San Juan Coatzospam
San Juan de los Cues
San Lorenzo Cuaunecuiltitla
San Lucas Zoquiapam
San Martín Toxpalan
San Mateo Yoloxochitlán
San Pedro Ocopetatillo
Santa Ana Ateixtlahuaca
Santa Cruz Acatepec
Santa María Chilchotla
Santa María Ixcatlán
Santa María la Asunción
Santa María Tecomavaca
Santa María Teopoxco
Santiago Texcalcingo
Teotitlán de Flores Magón

References

Districts of Oaxaca
Cañada, Oaxaca